The Wu Chuo-liu Art and Cultural Hall is an art and cultural center in Xihu Township, Miaoli County, Taiwan dedicated to Wu Chuo-liu for his contribution to Taiwanese literature.

Exhibitions
The hall displays the renowned works of Wu Chuo-liu. It also acts to gather the literature, art, tourism, local attraction and cultural resources in the cultural construction campaign.

Transportation
The hall is accessible within walking distance west of Nanshi Station of Taiwan Railways.

See also
 List of tourist attractions in Taiwan

References

Arts centres in Taiwan
Cultural centers in Miaoli County